The 2022 European Throwing Cup was held from 12 to 13 March 2022 in Leiria, Portugal.

Results

Men

Seniors

U23

Women

Seniors

U23

Medal table

Seniors

U23

Participating Issue
Because of Russian invasion of Ukraine, Russia and Belarus were banned.

References

European Throwing Cup
European Throwing Cup
European Throwing Cup
European Throwing Cup